The men's 200 metres hurdles was a hurdling event on the athletics programme at the 1900 Summer Olympics in Paris. It was held on July 16, 1900. 11 athletes from five nations competed in the middle of the three hurdling events. The event was won by Alvin Kraenzlein of the United States, earning his fourth individual gold in athletics in one Games—a record that still stands as of the 2016 Games. The silver medal went to Norman Pritchard of India, while another American (Walter Tewksbury) earned bronze.

Background

This was the first of only two times the event was held; it would return in 1904 but then be eliminated from the programme. American Alvin Kraenzlein was an overwhelming favorite; he had already won the 60 metres, 110 metres hurdles, and long jump by the time of the 200 metres hurdles.

France, Germany, Hungary, India, and the United States competed in the inaugural 200 metres hurdles event.

Competition format

The low hurdles competition consisted of two rounds: semifinals and a final. The semifinal round consisted of two heats, with 5 hurdlers in one and 6 in the other. The top 2 athletes in each semifinal advanced to the final.

Records

None, this was the first time the event was held.

Alvin Kraenzlein set the first Olympic record for this event when he ran 27.0 seconds in the first heat of the first round. Norman Pritchard improved this record in the second heat with 26.8 seconds. Finally Alvin Kraenzlein took the Olympic record by winning the final with 25.4 seconds.

Schedule

Results

Semifinals

In the semifinal round, there were two heats. The top two runners in each advanced to the final.

Semifinal 1

Kraenzlein won by four yards.

Semifinal 2

Pritchard won by two yards.

Final

Kraenzlein won by five yards, despite having been penalized one metre for a false start. The 200 metre hurdles was his fourth individual victory in Paris; no other track and field athlete has won as many individual victories in a single Olympics.

Results summary

References

Sources
 International Olympic Committee.
 De Wael, Herman. Herman's Full Olympians: "Athletics 1900". Accessed 18 March 2006.
 

Men's hurdles 200 metres
Sprint hurdles at the Olympics